Guido Gonella (18 September 1905 – 19 August 1982) was an Italian politician from the Christian Democracy, former Minister of Public Education and Minister of Justice.

Biography

Academic career 
Gonella graduated in Philosophy at the Catholic University of Milan and in Law at the Sapienza University of Rome, teaching a few years later Philosophy of law at the University of Bari and at the University of Pavia.

Journalistic career 
He later became a columnist of L'Osservatore Romano, receiving the task of talking about the foreign affairs by Bishop Giovanni Montini, the future Pope Paul VI. However, Gonella was kept under control by the political police for suspected anti-fascism: several times the fascist hierarchy asked Benito Mussolini to suppress the Vatican newspaper, but L'Osservatore Romano belonged to the Holy See and therefore could not be suppressed by the Italian government.

On 3 September 1939, a few days after the beginning of World War II, Gonella was arrested by the fascists and brought to Regina Coeli, being freed only after the intervention of Pope Pius XII. Though he returned to L'Osservatore Romano, he was forbidden to teach in Universities.

Political career 
Before the World War II, Gonella began to work with Alcide De Gasperi and took part in the drawing of the Code of Camaldoli, the document planning of economic policy by members of the Italian Catholic forces. In 1943, Gonella joined the new-born party Christian Democracy, with which he was elected to the Constituent Assembly in 1945, to the Chamber of Deputies from 1948 to 1968 and to the Senate from 1972 to 1979.

From 1950 to 1953 he has also been elected Secretary of the Christian Democracy.

He has been the first Minister of Public Education of the Italian Republic in the Cabinets led by Alcide De Gasperi and has been many times, over a period of 20 years, Minister of Justice.

During the 1978 presidential election, Gonella was the candidate of the Christian Democracy for the office of President of Italy, until the party decided, together with all the left-wing and centre-left parties in Parliament, to support the Socialist candidate Sandro Pertini.

Death 
Gonella died in Nettuno, near Rome, at the age of 76, on 19 August 1982, exactly 28 years after the death of Alcide De Gasperi.

References

External links 
Files about his parliamentary activities (in Italian): Constituent Assembly, I, II, III, IV, V, VI,VII, VIII legislature

1905 births
1982 deaths
Christian Democracy (Italy) politicians
Candidates for President of Italy
Education ministers of Italy
20th-century Italian politicians
Sapienza University of Rome alumni
Academic staff of the University of Bari
Academic staff of the University of Pavia
Politicians from Verona
Italian Ministers of Justice